Matías Fernando Vera (born 20 November 1995) is an Argentine professional footballer who plays as a right-back for Lanús.

Professional career
A youth product of Lanús, Vera joined Barracas Central on loan in 2019 but returned to Lanús in an emergency when they lost their other rightbacks. He made his professional debut with Lanús in a 2-0 Argentine Primera División loss to Aldosivi on 24 January 2020.

At the end of August 2021, Vera joined Gimnasia Mendoza on loan. However, he didn't play much due to the COVID-19 pandemic. In February 2021, Vera was loaned out to Los Andes for the rest of the year.

Personal life
Vera is the younger brother of the footballer Lucas Vera.

References

External links
 

1995 births
Living people
People from Quilmes Partido
Argentine footballers
Association football fullbacks
Club Atlético Lanús footballers
Barracas Central players
Gimnasia y Esgrima de Mendoza footballers
Club Atlético Los Andes footballers
Argentine Primera División players
Sportspeople from Buenos Aires Province